was a Japanese mathematician at Kyoto University working in topology. In 1917, he published the construction of the Lakes of Wada, which he named after his teacher Takeo Wada, to whom he credited the discovery.

Publications

References

Japanese mathematicians
1877 births
1968 deaths
Academic staff of Kyoto University